

Witchelina is a locality in the Australian state of South Australia located about  to the north-west  of the town of Leigh Creek and about  north of the Adelaide city centre.  The locality was established on 26 April 2013 in respect to “the long established local name.”  Its name is derived from the former pastoral lease of the same name. Witchelina is located within the federal Division of Grey, the state electoral district of Stuart, the Pastoral Unincorporated Area of South Australia and the state's Far North region.  The land use within Witchelina is concerned with the use of the former pastoral lease as a private protected area also known as Witchelina which has fully occupied its extent as of 2010.

See also
List of cities and towns in South Australia

References

Towns in South Australia
Places in the unincorporated areas of South Australia
Far North (South Australia)